Alexander Cudmore (February 10, 1888 – December 18, 1944) was an American amateur soccer player who competed in the 1904 Summer Olympics. He was born and died in St. Louis, Missouri. In 1904 he was a member of the Christian Brothers College team, which won the silver medal in the soccer tournament. He played all four matches as a forward.

References

External links
profile

1888 births
1944 deaths
American soccer players
Footballers at the 1904 Summer Olympics
Olympic silver medalists for the United States in soccer
Soccer players from St. Louis
Medalists at the 1904 Summer Olympics
Christian Brothers Cadets men's soccer players
Association football forwards